Gubernatorial elections in 2004 and 2005 were held in 25 federal subjects of Russia. In several regions these elections were moved from end of 2004 to March 14 to combine with the 2004 Russian presidential election.

On 12 December 2004, at the initiative of Russian President Vladimir Putin, gubernatorial elections were abolished throughout the country. These were the last gubernatorial elections in Russia until September 2012.

Race summary

Bryansk Oblast 
Governor of Bryansk Oblast Yury Lodkin was going on his third term in 2004 (fourth if 1993–96 tenure as Head of Administration counted), but was removed from registration "for abuse of office". The application to the regional court was submitted by the candidate from the People's Party Alexander Zhdanov. Lodkin, considered one of the favorites of the campaign, linked his removing from ballot with his Communist Party membership. He accused the United Russia party of “unwillingness to win legally”.

Samara Oblast 
The elections were set up by the regional court on 19 September 2004, after the court recognized that the 5-year term limit, introduced into the Samara Oblast Charter during the 2000 elections, can come into force only after next elections and that Konstantin Titov's term expired on July 2. However, the elections were later canceled by the Supreme Court at the suit of the Central Election Commission.

Nenets Autonomous Okrug 
Gubernatorial elections in Nenets Autonomous Okrug were held on 23 January 2005, the second round was held on February 6. Incumbent governor , in office from 1996, could not be nominated due to the two-term limit (the Supreme Court of Russia overturned regional act passed shortly before the elections that allowed Butov to run for a third term). In addition he was convicted for beating a traffic police officer.

Candidates included:
Alexey Barinov, President of a charitable foundation, former chief federal inspector for Nenets AO, ex-employee of LUKoil
Viktoria Bobrova, assistant of Nenets AO Regional Prosecutor
Vladimir Butov, relative and namesake of incumbent governor
Igor Koshin, member of Nenets AO legislature; former secretary of the political council of United Russia's regional branch, expelled from the party after self-nominating for governorship
Leonid Sablin, member of Nenets AO legislature, chairman of local executive committee (1985–90)
Alexander Shmakov, entrepreneur

Results

Aftermath 
On 18 February 2005, Alexey Barinov officially took office. In May 2006 he was arrested on charges of committing fraud. On June 2 of the same year, President Vladimir Putin removed Barinov from the governorship and appointed the chief federal inspector for the region, Valery Potapenko as the interim governor of NAO. Later, in 2007, Barinov was acquitted.

Literature

Notes

References

2005
2005 elections in Russia
2004 elections in Russia